Darbid or Dar-e Bid or Dar Bid or Dorbid may refer to:

Ilam Province
 Darbid-e Karani, a village in Shirvan and Chardaval County

Kerman Province

Kermanshah Province
 Darbid-e Mansuri, a village in Eslamabad-e Gharb County
 Darbid-e Ali Akbar, a village in Gilan-e Gharb County
 Darbid-e Hoseyn Ali, a village in Gilan-e Gharb County
 Darbid-e Nazer Ali, a village in Gilan-e Gharb County
 Darbid, Kangavar, a village in Kangavar County

Lorestan Province
 Darbid Haft Cheshmeh-e Olya, a village in Delfan County
 Darbid Haft Cheshmeh-e Sofla, a village in Delfan County
 Darbid-e Zangivand, a village in Delfan County
 Darbid-e Olya, a village in Selseleh County
 Darbid-e Sofla, a village in Selseleh County
 Darbid-e Vosta, a village in Selseleh County

Yazd Province
 Darbid, Yazd, a village in Yazd County